Engey is the second largest island of the Kollafjörður (Faxa Bay) fjord in western Iceland. To the northern end of the island, a lighthouse, first built in 1902, is located. The lighthouse was damaged and later restored in 1937.

References

Islands of Iceland